Mendelian traits in humans are human traits that are substantially influenced by Mendelian inheritance. Most — if not all — Mendelian traits are also influenced by other genes, the environment, immune responses, and chance. Therefore no trait is purely Mendelian, but many traits are almost entirely Mendelian, including canonical examples, such as those listed below. Purely Mendelian traits are a minority of all traits, since most phenotypic traits exhibit incomplete dominance, codominance, and contributions from many genes. If a trait is genetically influenced, but is not well characterized by Mendelian inheritance, it is often labeled as non-Mendelian.

Examples 
 Albinism (recessive)
 Achondroplasia
 Alkaptonuria
 Ataxia telangiectasia
 Brachydactyly (shortness of fingers and toes)
 Colour blindness (monochromatism, dichromatism, anomalous trichromatism, tritanopia, deuteranopia, protanopia)
 Cystic fibrosis
 Duchenne muscular dystrophy
 Ectrodactyly
 Ehlers–Danlos syndrome
 Fabry disease
 Galactosemia
 Gaucher's disease
 Haemophilia
 Hereditary breast–ovarian cancer syndrome
 Hereditary nonpolyposis colorectal cancer
 HFE hereditary haemochromatosis
 Huntington's disease
 Hypercholesterolemia
 Krabbe disease
 Lactase persistence (dominant) 
 Leber's hereditary optic neuropathy
 Lesch–Nyhan syndrome
 Marfan syndrome
 Niemann–Pick disease
 Phenylketonuria
 Porphyria
 Retinoblastoma
 Sickle-cell disease
 Sanfilippo syndrome
 Tay–Sachs disease
 Wet (dominant) or dry (recessive) earwax – dry is found mostly in Asians and Native Americans

References

Further reading

External links 
 OMIM Online Mendelian Inheritance in Man
 Myths of Human Genetics

Human genetics